Thrybergh Country Park is a reservoir and nature reserve in South Yorkshire. It is located between Thrybergh and Hooton Roberts on the outskirts of Rotherham and opened in 1983.

History 
The reservoir was created between 1876 and 1880 as a source of drinking water, primarily to serve the population of Doncaster to the east. In 1980 it was acquired by Rotherham Metropolitan Borough Council who opened the site as a nature reserve and country park in 1983. In 2006 it won a Green Flag Award for its green spaces.

Local and national importance 
Today the country park provides an important habitat for birds and other wildlife. Over 155 species of birds have been recorded as well as 20 species of mammals and 170 species of plants. It is popular with anglers (fly fishing) during the summer and walkers all year round. There are level footpaths that provide a circular route around the reservoir and these are suitable for buggies and wheelchairs.

During spring and autumn it is an important migration stop-over for birds and during the winter months it holds a large population of wintering ducks, geese and swans. Two public bird viewing hides are available.

Facilities and activities 

Thrybergh Country Park is accessible by car from the A630 Doncaster Road between Thrybergh and Hooton Roberts. There is a bus stop immediately outside the main entrance to the park on the A630 and a pay and display car park within the park.

Close to the car parking area, visitors will find a café with an outdoor seating area and a barbecue area. There is an ice cream parlour and toilets (including ones for disabled access) are available and it is possible to purchase bird seed to feed the ducks. Mobility scooters are also available for hire.

Park rangers are on site and Fly fishing permits can be purchased between March and October. Float Tubes can be used when fishing and there are rowing boats that fisherman can book 24 hours in advance, however the rangers have right to refuse a boat launch if weather conditions are unfit.

A campsite can be found within the country park, which has pitches for 24 caravans. There is also a children's play area.

Swimming is not allowed in the lake.

References

1983 establishments in England
Country parks in Yorkshire
Nature reserves in South Yorkshire
Reservoirs in South Yorkshire